Bulletin of the Seismological Society of America (BSSA) is a bimonthly peer reviewed scientific journal published by the Seismological Society of America. The editor-in-chief is Thomas Pratt (U. S. Geological Survey). The journal covers seismology and related disciplines. Topical coverage includes theory and observation of seismic waves, specific earthquakes, the structure of the Earth, earthquake sources, hazard and risk estimation, and earthquake engineering. Publishing formats include regular papers and short notes. Publication has been continuous since 1911.

Abstracting and indexing
This journal is indexed by the following services:
 
 Science Citation Index
 Current Contents / Physical, Chemical & Earth Sciences
 Chemical Abstracts Service
 Applied Science & Technology Index
  Coal Abstracts (International Energy Agency)
 International Aerospace Abstracts 
 GeoRef 
 Computer & Control Abstracts 
 Electrical & Electronics Abstracts 
 Physics Abstracts. Science Abstracts. Series A 
 Energy Research Abstracts

Notes
 Note: An apparent alternate title is "Seismological Society of America, Bulletin" with the abbreviation "Seismol. Soc. Am., Bull." 
 Note: the value of impact factor is tentative, and may be needing a reliable source. Found 2012 impact factor here.

References

External links
 
 Seismological Society of America

Seismology
Geology journals
Publications established in 1911
English-language journals
Earthquake engineering
Engineering journals
Academic journals published by learned and professional societies of the United States
1911 establishments in the United States